The Dundee Museum of Transport, located in Dundee, Scotland is a self-sustaining Scottish Charitable Organisation. The museum has a collection of historical items covering transport in Dundee and across Scotland.

History
In February 2010, representatives from several local groups met intending to establish Dundee Museum of Transport (DMofT).

A committee was elected to advance the plans as quickly as possible, and on 2 June 2010 Dundee Museum of Transport was granted charitable status. Shortly after being formed DMofT acquired the lease on a derelict building that previously was part of an abattoir. Over the next four years a group of volunteers with little outside help or financial assistance, renovated the building and made it habitable. On Saturday 26 April 2014, Dundee Museum of Transport opened to the public.

The museum opened on 26 April 2014 in one main hall, and over the next two years Halls two, three and four were completed and opened. Although the original intention was for the Market Mews site to be temporary, with a move slated for just a couple of years later, delays in acquiring and funding a permanent site pushed this back. Because of this, the museum currently has a lease extension at Market Mews until 2024.

From inception, the original Trustees intended to acquire the Maryfield tram depot as the museum’s eventual home. With the aid of a grant from Dundee City Council’s Common Good fund, the Maryfield site was purchased in 2015. The museum is now looking for funding to refurbish it. The current designs for the site were drawn up in 2019 and continue to be developed.

The former depot, built in 1901, has been out of use since 2005 and was owned by Scottish Water prior to being acquired by the museum.

Features
The museum offers four halls of artefacts from buses and trams used on local routes, motorbikes, pushbikes and cars from throughout the centuries and models of different ships and trains. There is also a gift shop and a café. 

On the 23 October 2020, the museum opened its most recent temporary exhibition, The Future of Transport, which takes on a retro futuristic feel while discussing the impact of transport on climate change and how transport is changing to counteract this.

Plans for the future
Over the next five years, from 2020 to 2025, the museum plans to renovate and move into the old tram depot at Maryfield. This will allow space to display more objects and provide a valuable history of Dundee. The new building will provide the resources to conduct more educational workshops and community work. At these new premises, the external ground and café will be open to the local community without admission to the museum. The development of the Maryfield premises will become part of the regeneration phase of the local area. The museum will also focus on sustainability and renewable energy. It is therefore planned that the new premises will have roof-mounted solar water heating panels to reduce energy demand, the museum is also planning for ground source heat pumps for the garden area. It will inform visitors about fossil-fuel-free transportation, which we have already started with, in The Future of Transport exhibition. There will also be a park and ride provided to other Dundee based visitor attractions to minimise the museums' carbon footprint.

The museum is one of the eight organisations, out of 264 proposals from 48 countries, that will exhibit at the UN COP26 in November 2021.

Gallery

References

External links 

 

Museums in Dundee
Transport museums in Scotland
Transport in Dundee
Museums established in 2010
2010 establishments in Scotland